Alexander Urusov can refer to the following:
Alexander Urusov (1729–1813) — Major General of the Russian Imperial Army.
Alexander Ivanovich Urusov — a lawyer, jurist, lawyer and a court spokesman.
Alexander Urusov (1766–1853) — Chief Chamberlain, president of the Moscow office of the palace during the construction of the Grand Kremlin Palace.
 — a Russian military leader, Major General
Alexander Petrovich Urusov (1850–1914) — Russia's social and political activist, co-founder of the All-Russian National Union.

See also
List of persons with the surname Urusov